Kingcome may refer to:

People
Brian Kingcome (1917–1994), British flying ace in World War II
John Kingcome, (d.1871), British admiral and commander of the Pacific Station of the Royal Navy
William Kingcome, nephew of Admiral John Kingcome and captain of the Hudson's Bay Company vessel, the Princess Royal

Places
Kingcome, British Columbia, a settlement and native village on the Coast of British Columbia
Kingcome Inlet, an inlet on the Coast of British Columbia
Kingcome Inlet, British Columbia, another settlement on that inlet
the Kingcome River, which enters the head of Kingcome Inlet
the Kingcome Glacier, a glacier at the head of the Kingcome River
the Kingcome Range, aka Kingcome Mountains, a subrange of the Pacific Ranges of the Coast Mountain, located east of Kingcome Inlet.
Kingcome Point, on Princes Royal Island in the North Coast region of British Columbia

Other
Kingcome Navigation, a former shipping company on the BC Coast now amalgamated into Seaspan International

See also
Alexander Turner (jurist) (1901–1993), full name Alexander Kingcome Turner, a notable lawyer in New Zealand and Knight Commander of the Order of the British Empire
Alfred Newman (politician) (1849–1924), full name Alfred Kingcome Newman, Mayor of Wellington, New Zealand in 1909 and later Member of Parliament in New Zealand
Kingdom Come (disambiguation)